Taki Government High School is a school in Taki, West Bengal, India.
Located by the side of the Ichhamati River, it is the oldest existing schools in Taki.

The school has grades 1 to 12 and the language of instruction is Bengali. Students take the 10+ (Madhyamik) examination under the West Bengal Board of Secondary Education and 12+ (Higher Secondary Examination) under the West Bengal Council of Higher Secondary Education. Grade 11 and 12 have two streams- science and arts. It is a boys-only school with a strength of about 500 students. The ex Student organization Taki Govt School "PRAKTONI SANGSAD" established in 2019. This "PRAKTONI SANGSAD" always look after School's activities.

History 
The school was established by zemindars of Taki and was taken over by the government in 1881. Rajmohan Raychowdhury, a zemindar of Taki, allegedly established the school for the education of the common people. The actual date of its establishment is not known, so 1881 is considered the year of its establishment.

Chronology 
 1881 - Taki Government High School was established
 1957 - The Higher secondary Course (Class XI) is introduced.
 1966 - The Morning Section (Class-I to Class-V) and the Day Section (Class-VI to Class-XI) was introduced.
 1978 - The Higher Secondary Course including Class XII was introduced.

Notable alumni 
 Ahsanullah, (Khan Bahadur) (1873-1965)

References

Boys' schools in India
Schools in Colonial India
Educational institutions established in 1881
High schools and secondary schools in West Bengal
1881 establishments in India
Schools in North 24 Parganas district